Fatafehi Fuatakifolaha (April 1944 – August 2017), styled Lord Veikune, was a Tongan noble and politician. 
He held the hereditary title of lord Veikune until 2006. He was a civil servant and later a member of the Legislative Assembly. He was appointed the speaker from 1999 to 2001 and from 2005 to 2006. He lost the speakership and his noble title due to conviction for tax evasion and bribery.

References

Tongan nobles
Members of the Legislative Assembly of Tonga
Speakers of the Legislative Assembly of Tonga
Tongan politicians convicted of crimes
1944 births
2017 deaths
People from Tongatapu